Hellinsia shyri is a moth of the family Pterophoridae. It is found in Ecuador.

The wingspan is 19–21 mm. The forewings are grey-brown with dense dark brown, diffuse scaling on the wings. The hindwings and fringes are brown-grey. Adults are on wing in April and December, at an altitude of 1,000 meters.

Etymology
The species is named after Shyri, a leader of the Caras people.

References

Moths described in 2011
shyri
Moths of South America